Roundhill is an unincorporated community in Butler County, Kentucky, United States, situated on Butler County's eastern boundary with Edmonson County.

Geography

The town is located along the Big Reedy Creek, a tributary of the Green River. Roundhill is part of the Bowling Green MSA, but it is part of Kentucky's Western Coal Fields region.

Education
Because of the community's extremely-close proximity to the Butler-Edmonson County line, it is on the boundary of two school districts based in Morgantown and Brownsville, respectively. Students west and/or south of the KY 70 and KY 185 junction attend Butler County Schools based in Morgantown, while students east and/or north of the junction attend Edmonson County Schools in the Brownsville area. North Butler Elementary in Jetson and Kyrock Elementary near Sweeden are the closest elementary/grade schools on their respective sides of the county line.

Sites of interest
Roundhill is home to two businesses along the county line, one is an auto parts/repair shop and the other, a convenience store named "The Corner Market," which is locally owned and operated since 1988 by the Raymer family, and it offers a limited grocery-line, lunch-meat, soft drinks, local weekly newspapers from both sides of the county line and, since the early to mid- 2010s, hot meals. That business also serves as the community's USPS village post office with ZIP code 42275. 

Roundhill Church of Christ is the main place of worship in this community. Just east of the community on KY 70 is Hopewell Baptist Church. Threlkel Cemetery is located just west of the community.

Nearby cities
Morgantown
Brownsville
Big Reedy
Bowling Green
Caneyville

References

External links
The Corner Market of Roundhill - official website
The Corner Market on Facebook

Roundhill
Roundhill
Unincorporated communities in Kentucky